Kilobaud Microcomputing was a magazine dedicated to the computer homebrew hobbyists from 1977 to 1983.

How kilobaud started
Wayne Green, the editor and publisher of kilobaud, had been the publisher of BYTE magazine, (another influential microcomputer magazine of the time) where he published the first four issues in his own office. But one day in November 1975 Wayne came to work, and found that his ex-wife and the rest of the Byte magazine staff had moved out of his office and had taken the January issue with them. Consequently, the January 1976 issue had Virginia Green listed as publisher instead of Wayne Green. Wayne was not happy with this development, so he left Byte to start a new magazine to compete with the fledgling Byte. He wanted to call it "KiloByte" to trump Byte. But the people of Byte quickly trademarked KILOBYTE as a cartoon series in Byte magazine. So he named the new magazine "kilobaud" instead. The magazine was first published in 1977.

Many name changes
The full title for the first magazines was kilobaud. The Computer Hobbyist Magazine (Jan 1977). These issues are unique for having a full index of the contents on the front cover but no illustrations (photographs). Later issues did have illustrations but also still had a full index on the cover, (a feature that remained for many years). The title was now shortened to only read "Kilobaud Microcomputing".

From the beginning of 1979 to the end of 1980 the subtitle "for business...education...FUN" was added. Later, after 1981, the "kilobaud" denominated was dropped altogether and the magazine was now simply called "Microcomputing" with the subtitle, "a wayne green publication". In 1984, the magazine folded.

After the success of kilobaud, Wayne Green diversified with magazines targeted to specific brands of home computers, such as 80-Microcomputing (also known as 80-Micro) a Magazine for TRS-80 users, InCider a magazine for Apple II users, Hot CoCo a magazine for TRS-80 Color Computers, RUN a magazine for Commodore 64 users and many others.

Intended readers
Even more than Byte magazine, kilobaud contained articles written for people who were building their own 8-bit microcomputers at home, or were writing homebrew software for these systems. kilobaud, (much more than Byte) contained articles written for electronic engineers (or hobbyists interested in electronics), rather than for people who were technically interested in computers but not in building their own computer from scratch. Articles like "Two Hobbies: Model Railroading and Computing" and the article (written by Don Lancaster) "Building a cheap video display for your Heathkit H-8" (a computer you could build yourself from a kit) are good examples.

In the May 1982 issue an article about building the Sinclair ZX-81 kit, the first, (and probably last) "mainstream" "do-it-yourself" computer kit was published.

After that the magazine more and more lost its hobby background and it looked like any other computer magazine.

See also
 ABC 80 performance test

References

External links

1977 establishments in New Hampshire
1983 disestablishments in New Hampshire
Monthly magazines published in the United States
Defunct computer magazines published in the United States
Home computer magazines
Magazines established in 1977
Magazines disestablished in 1983
Magazines published in New Hampshire